PS Iverna was a paddle steamer passenger vessel operated by the Drogheda Steam Packet Company from 1895 to 1902 and the  Lancashire and Yorkshire Railway from 1902 to 1912.

History

She was built by A. & J. Inglis of Glasgow for the Drogheda Steam Packet Company and operated between Drogheda and Liverpool. In 1902 she was transferred to the Lancashire and Yorkshire Railway when they took over the business of the Drogheda company. Unlike the Tredagh and Kathleen Mavourneen, which were scrapped following the arrival of the new screw steamers Colleen Bawn and Mellifont in 1903, the Iverna and Norah Creina remained in service until they were sold for scrap in 1912.

In 1912 the Iverna was scrapped by Thos. W. Ward of Inverkeithing.

References

1895 ships
Passenger ships of the United Kingdom
Steamships
Ships built on the River Clyde
Ships of the London and North Western Railway
Ships of the Lancashire and Yorkshire Railway
Paddle steamers of the United Kingdom